The Paracauari River is a river on the island of Marajó in the state of Pará, Brazil.
It discharges into the Marajó Bay at the mouth of the Tocantins River

Course

The Paracauari rises in the northeast part of the island of Marajó.
The north arm of the river is protected by the  Soure Marine Extractive Reserve, a sustainable use conservation area created in 2001 that protects the coastal mangroves to the north of the Soure municipal seat and the mangroves along the north bank of the Paracauari River and its left (north) tributary the Saco River.
The Paracauari flows into Marajó Bay, the mouth of the Tocantins River, at Soure, Pará.

See also
List of rivers of Pará

References

Rivers of Pará
Tributaries of the Amazon River